Eurrhyparodes syllepidia is a moth in the family Crambidae. It was described by George Hampson in 1898. It is found in Mexico and Costa Rica.

The wingspan is about 28 mm. The forewings are brown, suffused with purplish fuscous. There is a series of white points on the costa. The hindwings are semihyaline yellow with a black base.

References

Moths described in 1898
Spilomelinae